Hubert de Ravinel  (22 February 1934 – 14 February 2022) was a French-born Canadian television producer, writer, and academic.

Biography
De Ravinel earned a law degree in 1956, a degree in political science in 1957, and a master's degree in andragogy from the Université de Montreal in 1991. He arrived in Montreal in 1962 after spending two years in Chicago. He was a co-founder of the International Federation of Little Brothers of the Poor in Canada and served as its Director until 1977. He was also a founding member of the Association québécoise de gérontologie. From 2000 to 2010, he was an administrator of the Conseil d’administration de l'organisme Baluchon Alzheimer, serving as treasurer and vice-president.

A gerontology professor from 1977 to 1988, de Ravinel also published a weekly column in La Presse from January 1986 to December 1989. He published four essays on aging, a topic on which he also hosted numerous radio and television programs on Ici Radio-Canada Télé and Télé-Québec.

De Ravinel died in Montreal, Quebec on 14 February 2022, at the age of 87.

Publications
Vieillir au Québec (1972)
L'Âge démasqué (1979)
Les Enfants du bout de la vie (1980)
Au fil de l'âge (1988)
Le Défi de vieillir (1991)
Le Courage et la Tendresse (1992)
Car j'aime et j'espère (1994)
Vieillir au masculin (1997)
Le Temps libéré (2003)

Distinctions
Knight of the Order of La Pléiade (1995)
 (1999)
Knight of the National Order of Quebec (2002)
Knight of the Legion of Honour (2012)

References

1934 births
2022 deaths
Canadian male non-fiction writers
Canadian academics
French emigrants to Canada
Université de Montréal alumni
People from Fontainebleau
Knights of the National Order of Quebec
Chevaliers of the Légion d'honneur
20th-century Canadian non-fiction writers
20th-century Canadian male writers
21st-century Canadian non-fiction writers
21st-century Canadian male writers
Canadian non-fiction writers in French